Stéphane Perrault (born in Montreal, Quebec), is a Canadian civil servant and the current Chief Electoral Officer of Canada.

Career 
Perrault started his law career clerking for Supreme Court justice Claire L'Heureux-Dubé.

Perrault began his public sector career in 1998 as a Counsel with Justice Canada.

In 2007 Perrault joined Elections Canada. In December 2016, following the resignation of Marc Mayrand, Perrault was appointed Acting Chief Electoral Officer.

References

Living people
Chief Electoral Officer (Canada)
People from Montreal
Year of birth missing (living people)